Anton Liljenbäck (born 21 February 1995) is a Swedish football defender who plays for Varbergs BoIS.

References

1995 births
Living people
Swedish footballers
Association football defenders
Varbergs BoIS players
Jönköpings Södra IF players
Superettan players
Allsvenskan players